The 245 nucleotide sRNA of Escherichia coli, CsrC, was discovered using a genetic screen for factors that regulate glycogen biosynthesis. CsrC RNA binds multiple copies of CsrA, a protein that post-transcriptionally regulates central carbon flux, biofilm formation and motility in E. coli. CsrC antagonises the regulatory effects of CsrA, presumably by sequestering this protein. The discovery of CsrC is intriguing, in that a similar sRNA, CsrB, performs essentially the same function. Both sRNAs possess similar imperfect repeat sequences (18 in CsrB, nine in CsrC), primarily localised in the loops of predicted hairpins, which may serve as CsrA binding elements. Transcription of csrC increases as the culture approaches the stationary phase of growth and is indirectly activated by CsrA via the response regulator UvrY [1]. This RNA was also discovered in E. coli during a large scale screen [2]. The gene called SraK, was highly abundant in stationary phase, but low levels could be detected in exponentially growing cells as well [2].

See also 
 CsrB/RsmB RNA family
 PrrB/RsmZ RNA family
 RsmY RNA family
 RsmX
 CsrA protein

References

Further reading

External links 
 
 Pfam page for the CsrA protein family

Non-coding RNA